Frequency capping is a term in advertising that means restricting (capping) the number of times (frequency) a specific visitor to a website is shown a particular advertisement. This restriction is applied to all websites that serve ads from the same advertising network.

Frequency capping is a feature within ad serving that allows to limit the maximum number of impressions/views a visitor can see a specific ad within a period of time. E.g.: 3 views/visitor/24-hours means after viewing this ad 3 times, any visitor will not see it again for 24 hours. This feature uses cookies to remember the impression count. Non-cookies privacy-preserving implementation is also available.

Frequency capping is often cited as a way to avoid banner burnout, the point where visitors are being overexposed and response drops. This may be true for direct-response campaigns whose effectiveness is measured in click-throughs, but it might run counter to campaigns whose goal is brand awareness, as measured by non-click activity.

See also
 Session capping

References

Internet terminology
Online advertising